This is a list of judo techniques. They are categorized into throwing techniques (nage-waza), grappling techniques (katame-waza), body-striking techniques (atemi-waza), blocks and parries (uke-waza), receiving/breakfall techniques (ukemi), and resuscitation techniques (kappo).

Nage-waza (投げ技): throwing techniques

Te-waza (手技): hand throwing techniques 
 Ippon seoinage (一本背負投): Single-handed back throw
 Kata guruma (肩車): Shoulder wheel
 Kibisu gaeshi (踵返): One-hand reversal
 Morote gari (双手刈): Two-hand reap
 Obi otoshi (帯落): Belt drop
 Seoi nage (背負投):  Back throw 
 Seoi otoshi (背負落): Back drop 
 Sukui nage (掬投): Scoop throw
 Sumi otoshi (隅落): Corner drop
 Tai otoshi (体落): Body drop
 Uchi mata sukashi (内股透): Inner thigh void throw
 Uki otoshi (浮落): Floating drop
 Yama arashi (山嵐): Mountain storm
 Kouchi gaeshi (小内返): Small inner reap reversal
 Kuchiki taoshi (朽木倒): Single leg takedown

Unrecognized techniques

 Te Guruma (手車): Hand wheel. The Kodokan officially also refers to this technique as Sukui nage.

Koshi-waza (腰技): hip throwing techniques 

 Daki age (抱上): Hugging high lift. (Forbidden in competition.)
 Hane goshi (跳腰): Spring hip throw
 Harai goshi (払腰): Sweeping hip throw
 Koshi guruma (腰車): Hip wheel
 O goshi (大腰): Full hip throw
 Sode tsurikomi goshi (袖釣込腰): Sleeve lifting and pulling hip throw
 Tsuri goshi (釣腰): Lifting hip throw
 Tsurikomi goshi (釣込腰): Lifting and pulling hip throw
 Uki goshi (浮腰): Floating half-hip throw
 Ushiro goshi (後腰): Rear throw
 Utsuri goshi (移腰): Hip shift

Unrecognized techniques

 Tobi goshi (飛腰): Flying/surfing hip throw
 Ushiro Guruma(後車): Rear wheel

Ashi-waza (足技): foot throwing techniques 

 Ashi guruma (足車): Leg wheel
 De Ashi Harai (出足払): Advanced foot sweep
 Hane goshi gaeshi (跳腰返): Hip spring counter
 Harai goshi gaeshi (払腰返): Hip sweep counter
 Harai tsurikomi ashi (払釣込足): Lift-pull foot sweep
 Hiza guruma (膝車): Knee wheel
 Kosoto gake (小外掛): Small outer hook
 Kosoto gari (小外刈): Small outer reap
 Kouchi gari (小内刈): Small inner reap
 O guruma (大車): Large wheel
 Okuri Ashi Harai (送足払): Sliding foot sweep
 Osoto gaeshi (大外返): Big outer reap counter
 Osoto gari (大外刈): Big outer reap
 Osoto guruma (大外車): Big outer wheel
 Osoto otoshi (大外落): Big outer drop
 Ouchi gaeshi (大内返): Big inner reap counter
 Ouchi gari (大内刈): Big inner reap
 Sasae tsurikomi ashi (支釣込足): Propping and drawing ankle throw
 Tsubame gaeshi (燕返): Swallow counter
 Uchi mata (内股): Inner-thigh
 Uchi mata gaeshi (内股返): Inner-thigh counter

Sutemi-waza(捨身技): sacrifice techniques

Ma-sutemi waza (真捨身技): Rear sacrifice projections 
 Hikikomi gaeshi (引込返): Pulling in reversal
 Sumi gaeshi (隅返): Corner reversal
 Tawara gaeshi (俵返): Rice bag reversal throw
 Tomoe nage (巴投): Circle throw
 Ura nage (裏投): Rear throw

Yoko-sutemi waza (橫捨身技): side sacrifice projections 

 Daki wakare (抱分): High separation
 Hane makikomi (跳巻込): Springing wraparound
 Harai makikomi (払巻込): Hip sweep wraparound
 Kani basami (蟹挟): Crab or scissors throw. (Forbidden in competition.)
 Kawazu gake (河津掛): One-leg entanglement. (Forbidden in competition.)
 Osoto makikomi (大外巻込): Big outer wraparound
 Soto makikomi (外巻込): Outer wraparound
 Tani otoshi (谷落): Valley drop
 Uchi makikomi (内巻込): Inner wraparound
 Uchi mata makikomi (内股巻込): Inner thigh wraparound
 Uki waza (浮技): Floating technique
 Yoko gake (横掛): Side prop
 Yoko guruma (横車): Side wheel
 Yoko otoshi (横落): Side drop
 Yoko wakare (横分): Side separation

Unrecognized techniques
 Tama guruma (球車):Jade wheel. The Kodokan officially also refers to this technique as Kata guruma.
 Ude gaeshi (腕返): Arm reversal. The Kodokan officially also refers to this technique as Yoko wakare.
 Yoko Tomoe Nage (横巴投): Side circle throw. The Kodokan officially also refers to this technique as Tomoe nage.
 Kubi Nage Neck throw. The Kodokan officially also refers to this thechnique as Koshi guruma.

Katame-waza (固技): grappling techniques

Osaekomi-waza (抑込技): pins or matholds 

 Kesa-gatame (袈裟固): Scarf hold
 Kuzure-kesa-gatame (崩袈裟固): Broken scarf hold
 Ushiro-kesa-gatame (後袈裟固): Reverse Scarf Hold. The Kodokan officially also referred to this technique as kuzure-kesa-gatame until 2017.
 Kata-gatame (肩固): Shoulder hold
 Kami-shiho-gatame (上四方固): Upper four quarter hold down
 Kuzure-kami-shiho-gatame (崩上四方固): Broken upper four quarter hold down
 Tate-shiho-gatame (縦四方固): Vertical four quarter hold
 Yoko-shiho-gatame (横四方固): Side four quarter hold
  Ura-gatame (裹固) (1/1/2014 this is now recognized as a valid competition technique)
 Uki-gatame (浮固): Floating hold
 Unrecognized techniques

 Ura-kesa-gatame (裹袈裟固): The Kodokan officially also refers to this technique as Kuzure-kesa-gatame.
 Sangaku-Gatame : Triangular Hold (三角固): The Kodokan officially also refers to this technique as Kuzure-kami-shiho-gatame.

Shime-waza (絞技): chokes or strangles 

 Do-jime (胴絞): Trunk strangle. Do-jime is a prohibited technique in Judo, and is considered a 'slight infringement' according to IJF rules, Section 27: Prohibited acts and penalties, article 21
 Gyaku Jūji-jime (逆十字絞): Reverse cross strangle
 Nami-juji-jime (並十字絞): Normal cross strangle
 Kata-juji-jime (片十字絞): Half cross strangle
 Hadaka-jime (裸絞): Naked strangle
 Kata-ha-jime (片羽絞): Single wing strangle
 Kata-te-jime (片手絞): One-hand strangle
 Okuri-eri-jime (送襟絞): Sliding lapel strangle
 Ryo-te-jime (両手絞): Two-hand strangle
 Sankaku-jime (三角絞): Triangular strangle, triangle choke
 Sode-guruma-jime (袖車絞): Sleeve wheel strangle (Eziquiel/Ezekiel choke)
 Tsukkomi-jime (突込絞): Thrust choke

Unrecognized techniques

 Jigoku-jime (地獄絞): Hell strangle The Kodokan officially also refers to this technique as Okuri-eri-jime.
 Koshi-jime: The Kodokan officially also refers to this technique as Okuri-eri-jime.
 Ura-juji-jime (裹十字絞): The Kodokan officially also refers to this technique as Kata-juji-jime.
 Arm triangle choke: The Kodokan officially considers this an osaekomi-waza Kata-gatame.

Kansetsu-waza (関節技): joint locks

 Ashi-garami (足緘): Leg entanglement. (Forbidden in competition.)
 Ude-garami (腕緘): Arm entanglement or "figure-four" key lock
 Ude-hishigi-ashi-gatame (腕挫脚固): Side-lying arm bar
 Ude-hishigi-hara-gatame (腕挫腹固): Side-extended arm bar, lower stomach against opponent's elbow.
 Ude-hishigi-hiza-gatame (腕挫膝固): Knee arm bar.
 Ude-hishigi-juji-gatame (腕挫十字固): Back-lying perpendicular arm bar.
 Ude-hishigi-sankaku-gatame (腕挫三角固): Triangular arm bar.
 Ude-hishigi-te-gatame (腕挫手固): Hand lock.
 Ude-hishigi-ude-gatame (腕挫腕固): Arm lock.
 Ude-hishigi-waki-gatame (腕挫腋固): Armpit arm entanglement.

 Unrecognized techniques

 Ashi-Dori-Garami: Entangled leg dislocation
 Hiza-Hishigi: Knee crush
 Ashi-hishigi (足挫): Straight ankle lock
 Sankaku-garami (三角緘): Triangular entanglement. The Kodokan officially also refers to this technique as Ude-hishigi-hiza-gatame.

Attack patterns

Opponent on back 

 Near knee guard pass
 Simple guard pass
 Stacking guard pass

On own back 

 Elevator Sweep
 Push Sweep
 Yoko-gaeshi: Side reversal
 Hasami-gaeshi: Swissor sweep
 Shoulder pin rollover
 Ude-kakae

Opponent on all fours 

 Daki Wakare
 Turtle Flip Over
 Ura-gatame (裹固)
 Turnover from Koshi-jime
 Suso-sukui-nage
 Yoko-obi-tori-gaeshi
 Obi-tori-sumi-gaeshi
 Obi-tori-yoko-mawashi

On all own fours 

 Back Mount Escape
 Foot lock counter to rear-mounted position
 Switch back
 Hikouki or Hikoki-Nage: Aeroplane

Extracting own leg 

 Niju-garami: Double entanglement
 Immobilisation of arm

Atemi-waza (当て身技): body-striking techniques 

Although taught within kata (型 or 形) and sometimes used within informal randori (乱取), striking techniques are forbidden in standard judo competitions rules.

Ude-ate-waza (腕当て技): arm striking techniques

Kobushi-ate-waza: fist techniques 
 Tsukkake or Tsuki-kake: Straight punch
 Mae-naname-ate: Front crossing blow
 Naname-tsuki or Mawashi-tsuki: Roundhouse punch or circular punch
 Tsuki-age or Ago-tsuki: Uppercut
 Uchi-oroshi or Uchi-kake: Downward strike or hammer fist [pic]
 Yoko-ate: Side strike or backfist
 Yoko-uchi: Strike to side
 Gammen-tsuki: Thrust punch or jab
 Kami-ate or Ue-ate: Upward blow
 Shimo-tsuki: Downward blow
 Ushiro-sumi-tsuki: Rear corner blow
 Ushiro-uchi: Rear blow 
 Ushiro-tsuki: Rear strike (over shoulders)
 Ryote-tsuki: Two hand blow

Hiji-ate-waza: elbow techniques 
 Mae-hiji-ate: Elbow blow
 Ushiro-hiji-ate: Rear elbow strike [pic]
 Age-hiji-ate: Rising elbow strike
 Shita-hiji-ate or Oroshi-hiji-ate : Downward elbow strike

Tegatana-ate-waza: knife hand techniques 
 Kirioroshi: Downward knife hand cut
 Naname-uchi: Slanting knife hand blow [pic] [pic]

Yubisaki-ate-waza: fingertip techniques 
 Tsuki-dashi: Hand Thrust
 Ryogan-tsuki: Strike both eyes with fingertips
 Suri-age: Face slide or forehead thrust [pic] [pic]
 Yahazu: Strikes with the V-shape of the hand
 Me-tsubushi: Whipping the back of fingers to strike opponent's eyes

Ashi-ate-waza (足当て技): leg striking techniques

Sekito-ate-waza (蹠頭当): ball of foot techniques 
 Mae-keri (前蹴): Front kick [pic]
 Mae-naname-keri (前斜蹴): Front crossing kick or oblique kick
 Naname-keri (斜蹴) or Mawashi geri: Roundhouse Kick
 Taka-keri (高蹴): High front kick

Kakato-ate-waza: heel techniques 
 Yoko-geri: Side kick
 Ushiro-geri: Backward kick
 Ashi-fumi: Foot stomp

Hiza-gashira-ate-waza: knee cap techniques 
 Mae-hiza-ate: Front knee
 Yoko-hiza-ate: Side knee
 Hiza-otoshi: Dropping knee

Atama-ate-waza (頭当て技): head striking techniques 
 Mae-atama-ate: Strike with the forehead
 Ushiro-atama-ate: Strike with the occiput
 Atama-tsuki: Head thrust

Kyusho (急所): vital spots 

 Tento (天道/天倒): Top of the head, bregma 
 Uto (鳥兎) or Miken (眉間): Between the eyes, nation
 Kasumi (霞): Temple of the head
 Jinchu (人中): Below the nose, philtrum
 Zen-keibu (前頸部): Front side of neck with the Adam's apple
 Gwanto or Kachikake or Shita-ago (下顎): Point of the chin 
 Dokko (独鈷): Mastoid process
 Suigetsu (水月) or Mizu-ochi (水落): Solar plexus 
 Denko (電光): Right lowest floating rib 
 Getsuei (月影): Left lowest floating rib 
 Myojo (明星): 1-inch below the belly button, hypogastrium
 Tsuri-gane (釣鐘) or Kokan (股間): Testicles  
 Shitsu (膝) or Shita-kansetsu (下関節): Knee
 Ashi-no-ko (足の甲): The surface of foot

Uke-waza (受け技): blocks and parries 

 Tenkan or Tenkai: Outside turning or body rotation
 Age-uke: Rising block [pic]
 Harai-uke: Sweeping block
 Tegatana-uke: Knife hand block [pic]
 Shotei-uke: Palm block
 Juji-uke: Cross block
 Hiki-uke: Grasping block [pic] [pic]
 Morote-uke: Two hand block [pic]

Ukemi (受け身): receiving techniques or breakfall techniques 

 Ushiro-ukemi (後ろ受身): Backward breakfall
 Yoko-ukemi (横受け身): Sideways breakfall
 Mae-ukemi (前受け身): Forward breakfall
 Mae-mawari-ukemi (前回り受身) or Zempo-kaiten-ukemi: Forward roll

Kappo (活法): resuscitation techniques 

 Sasoi-katsu (誘活): Inductive method
 Eri-katsu (襟活): Lapel method
 So-katsu (総活): Composite method
 Kogan-katsu (睾丸活): Testicle-method

See also 
 List of Kodokan Judo techniques
 Chokehold
 Grappling hold
 Joint lock
 Throw (grappling)

Footnotes

Sources 

 Ohlenkamp, Neil (2006) Judo Unleashed basic reference on judo. .
 Ohlenkamp, Neil. The 67 Throws of Kodokan Judo. JudoInfo.com. URL last accessed March 6, 2006.
 The Kodokan Judo Institute. Kodokan.Org classification of techniques. www.kodokan.org. URL last accessed March 4, 2006.

External links 

 Techniques of Judo
 JudoVideo—Reference for the Kodokan judo techniques
 Medford Judo Academy - Techniques & Boards

 

Lists of judo techniques